Jonathan Paul Heasley (born January 27, 1997) is an American professional baseball pitcher for the Kansas City Royals of Major League Baseball (MLB). He made his MLB debut in 2021.

Career
Heasley attended Prestonwood Christian Academy in Plano, Texas and Oklahoma State University–Stillwater. He played college baseball for the Oklahoma State Cowboys. The Kansas City Royals selected Heasley in the 13th round of the 2018 Major League Baseball draft.

Heasley made his professional debut with the Idaho Falls Chukars. He pitched 2019 with the Lexington Legends and did not play a minor league game in 2020 because the season was cancelled due to the COVID-19 pandemic. He started 2021 with the Northwest Arkansas Naturals.

On September 17, Heasley's contract was selected to the active roster to make his major league debut that night.

References

External links

Oklahoma State Cowboys bio

1997 births
Living people
Sportspeople from Plano, Texas
Baseball players from Texas
Major League Baseball pitchers
Kansas City Royals players
Oklahoma State Cowboys baseball players
Idaho Falls Chukars players
Lexington Legends players
Northwest Arkansas Naturals players